Kurtziella perryae is a species of very small predatory sea snail, a marine gastropod mollusk in the family Mangeliidae.

Description
The length of the shell attains 7 mm.

Distribution
K. perryae can be found in the Gulf of Mexico, ranging from the coast of Texas to western Florida.

References

 Bartsch, Paul, and Harald A. Rehder. "New turritid mollusks from Florida." Proceedings of the United States National Museum (1939).
 Rosenberg, G., F. Moretzsohn, and E. F. García. 2009. Gastropoda (Mollusca) of the Gulf of Mexico, Pp. 579–699 in Felder, D.L. and D.K. Camp (eds.), Gulf of Mexico–Origins, Waters, and Biota. Biodiversity. Texas A&M Press, College Station, Texas

External links
  Tucker, J.K. 2004 Catalog of recent and fossil turrids (Mollusca: Gastropoda). Zootaxa 682:1–1295.
 

perryae
Gastropods described in 1939